Scott Froml (born 21 August 1987), better known by his stage name Kerser,  is an Australian rapper. He has released two mixtapes and several albums since 2009 and his second album No Rest for the Sickest reached No. 15 on the ARIA albums chart, while the album's tour DVD debuted at No. 1 on the ARIA Music DVD chart in 2013. His album S.C.O.T. reached No. 5 while his fourth album King was released on 13 November 2014 and reached number 9.

Biography
Scott Froml was born on 21 August 1987, in the vicinity of Campbelltown, New South Wales. He started his rap career at an early age while living in Campbelltown, rapping with his older brother Aaron (aka Rates) at age 11 and recording by 18. One of his major influences is Tupac.

Kerser released his first mixtape Straight Out Tha Gutter in 2009 with his second mixtape Down the Drain being released in 2010.

His first album The Nebulizer was released on 14 October 2011. The album was produced by Nebs, hence the name. According to an article in INpress, "Kerser is raw, aggressive and territorial," while the album is "A fervent mix of rave, rap, electro and r'n'b." He gained fame from the track "Kerser is the sickest" that was also on the first album.

His second album No Rest for the Sickest was released on 2 November 2012. It reached No. 15 on the ARIA Albums Chart, and No. 1 on the ARIA Urban Albums Chart. He toured nationally to support the album.

He was signed to management with Obese Records in 2013, and in late 2015 moved to an independent manager. In March 2013 he released the single "We Here Now" with Rates, which led to a national tour. Among his performances are the Breath of Life Festival in Tasmania alongside 360, Illy, Seth Sentry.

In August 2013 Kerser released The No Rest for the Sickest National Tour on DVD. It debuted at No. 1 on the ARIA Music DVD Chart.

His third album S.C.O.T. was released on 25 October 2013. The album features Nebs, Jay (Uf), and Jace Excel. It debuted at No. 1 on the ARIA Urban Albums Chart and No. 1 on the iTunes Chart, knocking off Linkin Park, David Dallas and Katy Perry in the charts. He toured Australia in February and March 2013 to support the album.

Kerser's fourth album King, produced by Nebs, was released on 14 November 2014.

His fifth album titled Next Step was released on 13 November 2015 and produced by Sinima Beats. It was Kerser's first album to be released under his label ABK Records and was distributed by Warner Music Australia.

Battle rap career

Kerser is a well-known battle rapper in Australia, appearing on circuits such as Got Beef, Grind Time Now Australia and Real Talk Battle League. Between 2010 and 2012, he only lost two battles (to Zone Doubt and Jay Legend respectively), excluding a well-publicised battle against 360 in December 2011, where no official winner was announced, however the decision to make the battle unjudged had come in at the last minute. His long-running rivalry with 360 heated up again in August 2013 when 360 released a diss track called "30 Minutes Tops", Kerser returns with a diss track called "Old Matt".  The rivalry and battle is widely known as the most viewed battle rap in the history of Australian hip hop, making it the benchmark for all major battles that have proceeded it. At the time of the battle, it elevated both rapper's careers greatly really showcasing the difference in culture between Sydney and Melbourne hip hop street culture.  In the years that have followed both Kerser and 360 have shown mutual professional respect for each other.

Discography

Albums

Mixtapes

EPs

Certified singles

Video releases

See also
Australian hip hop
Obese Records

References

External links

Obese Records artists
Living people
Australian male rappers
Rappers from Sydney
1987 births